Anita Klein (born 14 Feb 1960 Sydney) is an Australian painter and printmaker.

Biography
Anita Klein studied at Chelsea School of Art and the Slade School of Art in London. From 2003 - 2006 she was  president of the Royal Society of Painter Printmakers (PRE).
She has work in many private and public collections in Europe, the USA and Australia, including the Arts Council of Great Britain, the British Museum and the British Library. She has had many solo exhibitions in the London as well as worldwide, and three monographs of her paintings have been published.

Anita Klein now divides her time between studios in London and in Italy.

Reception
It is nice to have a real humorist recruited to the ranks of gifted painters. She is to be congratulated on livening up our dreary lives.

John Russell Taylor:
Ravel said he wanted his music to be complex, but not complicated. Anita Klein might say the same of her art. There is a grand simplicity to her works, but that is not the same as saying that they lack subtlety and ambiguity. On the contrary, they have the sort of unselfconscious directness that comes from living and breathing art for so long that it becomes second nature.

References

External links 
www.anitaklein.com
www.banksidegallery.com
www.advancedgraphics.co.uk 
www.thefineartpartnership.co.uk
www.boudarygallery.com
www.hackwoodartfestival.co.uk/reviews.php
"Anita Klein", The Times
www.artconcoction.com/artists/anita-klein.htm

Living people
1960 births
20th-century Australian women artists
20th-century Australian artists
21st-century Australian women artists
21st-century Australian artists
Australian painters
Women printmakers
Australian printmakers